Gnomonia dispora is a fungal plant pathogen.

References

Fungal plant pathogens and diseases
Gnomoniaceae
Fungi described in 1936